The following persons have been mayor of the commune and city of Esch-sur-Alzette in Luxembourg.

List of mayors

Footnotes

 
Esch-sur-Alzette